Kyiv pogrom may refer to:

 Kiev pogrom (1881)
 Kiev pogrom (1905)

 Kyiv pogroms (1919)